Küffner or Kuffner is a surname. Notable people with the surname include:
 Aaron Kuffner (born 1975), American artist
 Andreas Kuffner (Luftwaffe), recipient of Knight's Cross of the Iron Cross
 Andreas Kuffner (rower) (born 1987), German rower
 James Kuffner (1971-), Robotics Professor and Researcher
 Joseph Küffner (Kueffner, 1776–1856), German musician and composer
 Moriz von Kuffner (1854–1939), Jewish-Austrian industrialist, art collector, mountaineer and philanthropist
 Ryan Kuffner (born 1996), Canadian ice hockey player
 William Kueffner (1840–1893), officer in the Union Army during the American Civil War